Louis Nègre (born 8 February 1947) is a member of the Senate of France, one of five senators representing the Alpes-Maritimes department.

He is a member of the Union for a Popular Movement and has been the mayor of Cagnes-sur-Mer since 1995.

References
Page on the Senate website

1947 births
Living people
People from Nice
Union for a Popular Movement politicians
French Senators of the Fifth Republic
Senators of Alpes-Maritimes